Abdolabad (also Romanized as ‘Abdolābād; also known as ‘Abdolābād-e Bālā) is a village in Belharat Rural District, Miyan Jolgeh District, Nishapur County, Razavi Khorasan Province, Iran. At the 2006 census, its population was 469, in 107 families.

See also 

 List of cities, towns and villages in Razavi Khorasan Province

References 

Populated places in Nishapur County